The Breda Mod. 35 is a hand grenade issued to the Royal Italian Army during World War II.

Description
Entered into service in 1935, the Breda Mod. 35, together with the SRCM Mod. 35 and the OTO Mod. 35 represented the new generation of hand grenades with which the Royal Italian Army faced the Second World War. It is an offensive type hand grenade, made up of an aluminium cylindrical body with the two trunk-conical shaped ends of, painted red and loaded with 63 grams of TNT-dinitronaphthalene that at the time of the explosion projects splinters in a radius of 10 meters.
The device consists of the charge carrier, the detonator, the capsule and the needle carrier. It has two safeties, an ordinary one consisting of a rubber flap attached to a plate with two branches, and an automatic one consisting of headphones, cross bar and brass tape delay.

At the moment of use the ordinary security is flipped and the grenade thrown, the headset is reversed causing the disrolling of delay tape, finally dragging the crossbar to safety. At this time the bomb is ready to explode, as soon as the collision with the ground overcomes the resistance of the antagonist spring, it causes the advancement of the pin that strikes the capsule, triggering the explosion.

Versions
 "War": body red.
 "inert": burnished.
 "charge reduced for training": white with red stripe.
 Breda Mod. 40: differed from Mod. 35 for the bursting charge which is constituted by autarchic explosive based on ammonium nitrate, being very hygroscopic, is contained in a watertight charge carrier[1].
 Breda Mod. 40: (not to be confused with the previous one) is constituted by a normal Mod. 35 mounted on top of a wood or bakelite handle, in style of German bombs. The total length of the bomb then goes to 241 mm. The headphone safe is replaced by a bucket that upon release of the handle, is released from a spring and is released in the air. The bomb body finally is made of steel instead of aluminum. This version was developed Breda Mod. 42 anti-tank.

See also
 OTO Mod. 35
 SRCM Mod. 35

Bibliography
 Armi della fanteria italiana nella seconda guerra mondiale by Nicola Pignato, Albertelli, 1971
 Le armi e le artiglierie in servizio by F. Grandi, 1938.

External links
 Regioesercito.it
 Army1914-1945.org.pl (Polish)
 http://www.talpo.it/breda.html
 Breda Mod. 35 (Italian)

World War II infantry weapons of Italy
Grenades of Italy
Fragmentation grenades